{{DISPLAYTITLE:C6416H9874N1688O1987S44}}
The molecular formula C6416H9874N1688O1987S44 (molar mass: 143858.028 g/mol) may refer to:

 Rituximab
 Tositumomab

Molecular formulas